The Super J-Cup is a periodically held professional wrestling tournament featuring junior heavyweight wrestlers from all over the world promoted by New Japan Pro-Wrestling (NJPW). This tournament differs from NJPW's annual Best of the Super Juniors tournament in that it is single elimination, while Best of the Super Juniors has a round robin format.

The Super J-Cup was originally conceived by Japanese wrestler Jushin Thunder Liger as a showcase for promotions from Asia and North America, including Liger's home promotion New Japan Pro-Wrestling (who hosted the first tournament in 1994), Frontier Martial-Arts Wrestling,  Wrestle Association R, Michinoku Pro Wrestling, Consejo Mundial de Lucha Libre, and the Social Progress Wrestling Federation.  In the following years, wrestlers representing various other NJPW partner promotions would also participate.

Since the original Super J-Cup in 1994, the tournament has taken place sporadically (1995, 2000, 2004, 2009, 2016, 2019, and 2020). The original is widely regarded as one of the greatest professional wrestling shows of all time. Dave Meltzer, editor of the Wrestling Observer Newsletter, called the 1994 Super J-Cup "the most incredible single night of wrestling ever".

Dates, venues and winners

Tournament history

1994

The inaugural Super J-Cup tournament was hosted by New Japan Pro-Wrestling. The event took place on April 16, 1994, at Sumo Hall in Tokyo, Japan.

1995

The second Super J-Cup was hosted by Wrestle Association R taking place on December 13, 1995, at Sumo Hall in Tokyo, Japan.

2000

The third Super J-Cup tournament was a two-night event hosted by Michinoku Pro Wrestling. The first round was held on April 1, 2000 at Sendai City Gymnasium in Sendai, Japan and the final three rounds were held on April 9, 2000 at Sumo Hall in Tokyo, Japan.

2004

The fourth Super J-Cup was promoted by Osaka Pro Wrestling and was held on February 21, 2004, at Osaka-jō Hall in Osaka, Japan.

2009

The fifth Super J-Cup tournament was produced by New Japan Pro-Wrestling. It was a two-night event taking place on December 22 and December 23, 2009 at the Korakuen Hall in Tokyo, Japan.

2016

The sixth Super J-Cup tournament was promoted by New Japan Pro-Wrestling. It was a two-night event taking place on July 20, 2016 and August 21, 2016. The first round held on July 20 took place at the Korakuen Hall in Tokyo, Japan, while the next three rounds took place on August 21 at the Ariake Coliseum in Tokyo, Japan.

2019
The seventh Super J-Cup tournament is promoted by New Japan Pro-Wrestling. It was a three-night event taking place on August 22, 2019, August 24, 2019, and August 25, 2019. The first round took place on August 22 at the Masonic Temple Building-Temple Theater in Tacoma, Washington. The second round took place on August 24 at San Francisco State University's Student Life Events Center in San Francisco, California. The semi-finals and final took place on August 25 at Walter Pyramid in Long Beach, California.

2020

The eighth Super J-Cup tournament is promoted by New Japan Pro-Wrestling. During the Road to Power Struggle Show on November 2, it was announced that on December 12 a new edition of the Super J-Cup will take place in the United States, with 8 participants announced.

See also
Puroresu
New Japan Pro-Wrestling
Wrestle Association R
Michinoku Pro Wrestling
Osaka Pro Wrestling
J-Cup Tournament
Jersey J-Cup

References

 
New Japan Pro-Wrestling tournaments
New Japan Pro-Wrestling shows
International sports competitions hosted by Japan
WAR (wrestling promotion) events